Pizziolo is a surname. Notable people with the surname include:

Corrado Pizziolo (born 1949), prelate in the Roman Catholic Church
Mario Pizziolo (1909–1990), Italian footballer and manager